Sigmund "Sig" Anderman (born 1941) is an American businessman, attorney, and philanthropist.

Education 
Anderman was born in New York City in 1941 and attended New York public schools, graduating from City College of New York with a B.S. in Education in 1962. He earned a Bachelor of Laws degree from New York University in 1965.

Career 
After graduating, Anderman worked for the law firm of Winer, Neuburger and Sive (now Sive, Paget and Reisel), a New York law firm specializing in corporate and environmental law. For many years, he along with partner, David Sive, was part of the legal team handling lawsuits that defined the environmental movement in America. He participated in Scenic Hudson Preservation Conference v. Federal Power Commission (1971). The case, for the first time in American jurisprudence, gave standing for bringing a lawsuit to a citizens group without a financial interest in the project. The project proponent, Con Edison, eventually abandoned the project. Committee for Nuclear Responsibility, Inc. v. Schlesinger (1971), argued before the Supreme Court of the United States. That case, which sought to enjoin the government's testing of a nuclear bomb under Amchitka, Alaska was eventually lost, but brought public attention to the risks and potential environmental damage from underground nuclear bomb testing.

In 1979, Anderman changed careers, becoming Chief Executive Officer of American Home Shield Corporation, the pioneering home warranty company that he helped found in 1973. After American Home Shield was sold in 1982 (still the dominant home warranty company in the country), Anderman started CompuFund, Inc., a computerized mortgage origination company, founded in 1982; and Inspectech, Inc., a computerized home inspection service, founded in 1992.

In 1998, Anderman founded Ellie Mae. He was president and Chief Executive Officer of Ellie Mae from 1998 to 2015, and until April 2019 was Executive Chairman of the Board. In 2019, Ellie Mae was purchased by private equity firm Thoma Bravo for $3.7 Billion .

Anderman's wrote several books and articles relating to entrepreneurship, including The Eight Patterns of Highly Effective Entrepreneurs by New York Times’ writer Brent Bowers, Small Business Growth Strategies, and Leadership Plans for CEOs: Top CEOs on Building a Team, Achieving Goals and Delivering Value,” by Aspatore, and Tom Peters’ “Re-Imagine!: Business Excellence in a Disruptive Age,” and the 2005 Tom Peters’ PBS Special on Business Excellence and Innovation.

References 

1941 births
City College of New York alumni
New York University alumni
Businesspeople from New York City
Living people